Live Action is an American nonprofit anti-abortion organization. Lila Rose founded and leads the group. Live Action is known for its undercover videos taken at Planned Parenthood clinics.

Background
In 2003, at the age of 15, Rose founded Live Action and began giving presentations to schools and youth groups. While a freshman at UCLA, she partnered with conservative activist James O'Keefe to conduct undercover videos of abortion providers. They conducted their first undercover video in a Planned Parenthood clinic in 2007 in Los Angeles.

Activities

Undercover videos
In 2010, a sting by Live Action on a Birmingham, Alabama, Planned Parenthood clinic led to a state investigation and the clinic being placed on probation by the Department of Health for what the state described as a "technical violation."

Live Action gained attention in February 2011 for undercover videos at multiple Planned Parenthood affiliates. The videos show Planned Parenthood staff counseling an investigator posing as a pimp on how to procure clandestine abortions and STD testing for his underage sex workers. According to spokespeople at Planned Parenthood, the organization reported the activities of the individuals involved to the Federal Bureau of Investigation before the videos were made public. Neither the Justice Department nor the FBI would confirm that an investigation was launched.

After the video releases, Planned Parenthood denied Live Action's allegations that they condone or support sexual slavery and statutory rape. They also fired one of the employees in question.

In May 2012, Live Action released a video showing an employee at a Planned Parenthood clinic in Austin, Texas advising a woman pretending to be pregnant and seeking an abortion if her fetus was female when she wanted a male (sex-selective abortion), that Planned Parenthood will not deny the woman an abortion no matter her reasons for wanting it. After the video was released, Planned Parenthood stated that the staffer in the video "did not follow our protocol" for dealing with "a highly unusual patient scenario," fired the employee, and stated that "all staff members at this affiliate were immediately scheduled for retraining in managing unusual patient encounters."

In the spring of 2013, Rose released a series of undercover videos documenting late-term abortion doctors' stated policy toward children born alive as the result of a failed abortion attempt. The video release coincided with intense media scrutiny of the ongoing Kermit Gosnell murder trial. These include a video where a Washington, D.C. abortion doctor, admits that he would let a child die if born alive during an abortion.

Abortion-rights commentators have accused Live Action of editing the Inhuman videos in an intentionally misleading manner, although Live Action also provides full, unedited footage for public viewing. William Saletan of Slate criticized Live Action's Inhuman videos as "orchestrated to embarrass doctors and their clinics" and edited to take out footage "showing the true complexity of abortion and the people who do it" in a video showing some of the unused clips.

Legislative
Live Action has advocated to deny federal and state funding to Planned Parenthood.

Following Live Action's release of undercover videos in Planned Parenthood clinics, the U.S. House of Representatives approved in February 2011 an amendment by Republican Rep. Mike Pence to cut federal funding to Planned Parenthood.

Social media
Live Action has the largest social media presence of any nonprofit anti-abortion organization. The organization has been subject to restrictions from multiple social media platforms.

In 2017, Twitter restricted Live Action from advertising on the platform, flagging Live Action's content as "sensitive." In June 2019, Pinterest permanently banned Live Action for spreading "harmful misinformation, [which] includes medical misinformation and conspiracies that turn individuals and facilities into targets for harassment or violence," following allegations by Live Action that Pinterest had restricted its content by placing it on a list of "blocked pornography sites," per a whistleblower at the social media platform. Pinterest did not specify which Live Action content prompted the ban. In August 2019, Live Action sent cease-and-desist letters to Pinterest and YouTube alleging discrimination in suppressing Live Action content and videos. That same month, Facebook fact-checkers marked as "false" two Live Action videos that stated "abortion is never medically necessary." After Live Action and a group of Republican senators challenged this move as politically motivated censorship, an internal review took place and Facebook retracted the false markers on the videos.

On January 30, 2020, video-sharing social networking service TikTok banned Live Action's channel "due to multiple Community Guidelines violations" after the group posted a video of a woman choosing between an anti-abortion-rights and pro-abortion-rights pill, a meme derived from the film The Matrix. By the next day, TikTok restored Live Action's account, calling the block a "mistake" based on "human error by a moderator."

Protests
In May 2019, Live Action members held a protest in Philadelphia to rally against alleged harassment of abortion rights opponents by Representative Brian Sims in videos he made and published online.

References

External links
 

Anti-abortion organizations in the United States
Non-profit organizations based in the United States
2003 establishments in the United States
Organizations established in 2003